.cymru is one of two geographic top level domains (GeoTLD) for Wales (the other being .wales). The word Cymru means Wales in Welsh.

Proposal and use 
The TLD was proposed by the British internet registry company Nominet, which has run the domain for the UK (.uk) since 1996. The proposal initially ran into conflict with .cym, proposed by the Wales-based, not-for-profit dotCYM organisation, which advocates for the Welsh language and culture. (.cym was ultimately assigned to the Cayman Islands.)

In June 2014, final go-ahead for the domains was granted by ICANN, and a phased launch of the new domains began. Initially, the new domains were available to trademark holders, with full availability originally planned for the spring of 2015.

On 30 September 2014, the Llywydd of the Senedd officially moved Senedd websites and other sites to new ".cymru" and ".wales" domains which are geographic top-level domains specific to Wales. Wales Online, Daily Post, the Welsh Rugby Union, the Millennium Stadium, Golwg360, Bloc, Gwalia, Atlantic PLC, Orchard and Portmeirion were among others who also switched over to the domains. These became available to all on St David's Day 2015.

See also 
Wikipedia articles on some other top-level domains based on language and culture:
 .scot
 .bzh
 .cat
 .eus
 .gal
 .quebec

References

External links 
 Nominet: Cymru - Wales (in English)
 Our Home Online (Domain for Wales) (in English and Welsh)
 The European Cultural and Linguistic Domains Network .

Cymru
Cymru
Computer-related introductions in 2015
2015 establishments in Wales